Randomness is the property of lacking any sensible predictability.

Random may also refer to:

Science and technology
 Randomized experiment, experimental design in which interventions are randomly allocated to minimise bias, for instance in a clinical trial
 Statistical randomness, numeric sequence with recognisable pattern
 Random number
 Random variable
 /dev/random, a way of obtaining random numbers in operating systems
 Random (software), Soft

Places
 Random Lake, Wisconsin, US
 Random Island, Canada
 Brighton, Vermont, US, formerly known as Random
 Random Hills, Victoria Land, Antarctica

Music
 Random (musician)
 Random (band)
 "Random" (Lady Sovereign song), a 2004 song by Lady Sovereign
 "Random" (G-Eazy song), a 2015 song by G-Eazy
 "Random", a song by Gary Numan released as a bonus track on his album The Pleasure Principle
 "Random", a song from the 311 album by the band 311
 Random (album), Random (02), tribute albums to Gary Numan
 Random, a 2017 album by Charly García
 Random (rapper), Italian rapper and singer

People
 Ida Random (born 1945), American production designer
 Bob Random (born 1943), Canadian actor

Characters
 Random (comics), a character in the Marvel Universe
 Random, a character of The Chronicles of Amber, in the novels of Roger Zelazny
 Random Dent, a character in the Hitchhikers Guide book Mostly Harmless
 Random Hajile, also known as Randam, a character in the Snatcher video game
 J. Random Hacker
 Lobster Random

See also
 Random House, a book publisher
 Non sequitur (disambiguation)